Tone Ng Shiu (born 26 May 1994) is a New Zealand rugby union player.

Career
Ng Shiu made his international debut for New Zealand Sevens in 2017. He was named the 2019 New Zealand Rugby Sevens Player of the Year. He was named in the New Zealand squad for the Rugby sevens at the 2020 Summer Olympics.

Ng Shiu was part of the All Blacks Sevens squad that won a bronze medal at the 2022 Commonwealth Games in Birmingham. He was selected for the team again for the 2022 Rugby World Cup Sevens in Cape Town. He won a silver medal after his side lost to Fiji in the gold medal final.

References 

1994 births
Living people
Rugby union players from Napier, New Zealand
New Zealand rugby union players
New Zealand rugby sevens players
Olympic rugby sevens players of New Zealand
Rugby sevens players at the 2020 Summer Olympics
Olympic medalists in rugby sevens
Olympic silver medalists for New Zealand
Medalists at the 2020 Summer Olympics
Sportspeople from Napier, New Zealand
Rugby sevens players at the 2022 Commonwealth Games
Commonwealth Games bronze medallists for New Zealand
Commonwealth Games medallists in rugby sevens
Medallists at the 2022 Commonwealth Games